William Mathews may refer to:

William Mathews (cricketer) (1793–1858), English cricketer
William A. Mathews (1800–1856), Texas colonist, soldier, courier and quartermaster in the Texas Revolution
William Mathews (mountaineer) (1828–1901), English mountaineer and botanist
William Gordon Mathews (1877–1923), federal judge and lawyer in West Virginia
Bill Mathews (William Henry Mathews, 1919–2003), Canadian geologist

See also
William Matthews (disambiguation)